The Military Cabinet of Fouad Chehab fifteenth Lebanese government after independence, and the fifteenth under President Bechara El Khoury. The cabinet was the first government since independence to be headed by a non-Sunni sect and formed by Major General Fouad Chehab. The government which was an emergency cabinet was formed by Decree No. 9444 on 18 September 1952 and it continued to operate until 30 September 1952. The government oversaw the process of electing the President of the Republic to succeed President Bechara El Khoury, who resigned after forming the government.

List 
The cabinet was composed of the following three members:

References

Lebanese governmental organisations
1952 establishments in Lebanon
Cabinets of Lebanon
Cabinets established in 1952
Cabinets disestablished in 1952
1952 disestablishments in Lebanon